Businde is an administrative ward in Kigoma-Ujiji District of Kigoma Region in Tanzania. 
In 2016 the Tanzania National Bureau of Statistics report there were 2,681 people in the ward, from 2,436 in 2012.

Villages / neighborhoods 
The ward has 9 villages and neighborhoods.

 Bidyoha
 Kirugu
 Kitwalo
 Mnazimoja
 Msikitini
 Mwanzini
 Pima
 Rubabi
 Toro

References

Wards of Kigoma Region